Sir Richard Hoghton, 3rd Baronet (c. 1616 – 3 February 1678) was an English politician who sat in the House of Commons  at various times between 1640 and 1656. He supported the Parliamentary cause in the English Civil War.

Biography
Hoghton was the eldest son of Sir Gilbert Hoghton, 2nd Baronet.
 
In 1645, Hoghton was elected Member of Parliament for Lancashire in the Long Parliament. Unlike his Royalist father, he was a zealous supporter of parliament and a firm adherent of the Presbyterian cause. He succeeded his father in the baronetcy in April 1647.  In 1656 he was re-elected MP for Lancashire in the Second Protectorate Parliament.

He was appointed Sheriff of Lancashire in 1659. After the restoration Hoghton was a patron of nonconformist ejected ministers.

Family
Hoghton married Lady Sarah, daughter of Philip Stanhope, 1st Earl of Chesterfield, and had several sons and daughters: of the sons, those survived to maturity were:
Charles, his successor, and the great-great-great-grandfather of author/mathematician Lewis Carroll.
Benjamin, who died unmarried.

Character
One who knew him well gives this character of him:—"It has pleased Almighty God, by a sudden stroke, to make a sad breach in a worthy family, in taking away the chief head thereof; a person of great worth and honour, of an honourable extraction, of a generous disposition, and of a courteous, kind, and affable temper...".

Notes

References

Further reading

1616 births
1678 deaths
Baronets in the Baronetage of England
Members of the Parliament of England (pre-1707) for Lancashire
High Sheriffs of Lancashire
English MPs 1640–1648
English MPs 1656–1658
People from Hoghton